is a private university in Sagamihara, Kanagawa, Japan. The predecessor of the school was founded in 1890. The school has no relation to Azabu High School in Tokyo.

History
The predecessor of Azabu University was the Tokyo Veterinary Training School, established in September 1890. It was renamed Azabu Veterinary School in January 1894 and Azabu Veterinary Technical School in 1934. The facilities of the school in downtown Tokyo were destroyed by the bombing of Tokyo in World War II in May 1945.

The school was reestablished in June 1947 on its present location in Sagamihara, Kanagawa and renamed Azabu Veterinary College in April 1950. A graduate school program was begun in April 1960. The school expanded with the establishment of the College of Environmental Health in April 1978 and was renamed Azabu University in April 1980. A Research Institute of Biosciences was established in 1988.

Organization
 Graduate Program
 Graduate School of Veterinary Science
 Veterinary Science
 Animal Science and Biotechnology
 Undergraduate Program
 School of Veterinary Medicine
 Veterinary Medicine 
 Animal Science and Biotechnology 
 School of Life and Environmental Science 
 Medical Technology 
 Food and Life Science
 Environmental Science
 College of Environmental Health 
 Environmental Health Research 
 Hygienic Technology
 Environmental Policy 
 Institute of Biosciences
 High-tech Research Center
 Veterinary Teaching Hospital

External links
 Official website 

 

Educational institutions established in 1890
Private universities and colleges in Japan
Azabu University
Veterinary schools in Japan
Western Metropolitan Area University Association
1890 establishments in Japan